Magdalene Sibylle of Saxe-Weissenfels may refer to:

Magdalena Sibylle of Saxe-Weissenfels (1648–1681), German noblewoman
Magdalene Sibylle of Saxe-Weissenfels (1673–1726), German noblewoman